Väljaküla is a village in Valga Parish, Valga County in southern Estonia. It has a population of 71 (as of 1 January 2010).

References

 

Villages in Valga County